Etta Jones (November 25, 1928 – October 16, 2001) was an American jazz singer. Her best-known recordings are "Don't Go to Strangers" and "Save Your Love for Me". She worked with Buddy Johnson, Oliver Nelson, Earl Hines, Barney Bigard, Gene Ammons, Kenny Burrell, Milt Jackson, Cedar Walton, and Houston Person.

Biography

Jones was born in Aiken, South Carolina, and raised in Harlem, New York. Still in her teens, she joined Buddy Johnson's band for a tour although she was not featured on record. Her first recordings—"Salty Papa Blues", "Evil Gal Blues", "Blow Top Blues", and "Long, Long Journey"—were produced by Leonard Feather in 1944, placing her in the company of clarinetist Barney Bigard and tenor saxophonist Georgie Auld. In 1947, she recorded and released an early cover version of Leon Rene's "I Sold My Heart to the Junkman" (previously released by the Basin Street Boys on Rene's Exclusive label) while at RCA Victor Records. She performed with the Earl Hines sextet from 1949 to 1952.

She had three Grammy nominations: for the Don't Go to Strangers album in 1960, the Save Your Love for Me album in 1981, and My Buddy (dedicated to her first employer, Buddy Johnson) in 1998. In 2008 the album Don't Go to Strangers was inducted into the Grammy Hall of Fame.

Following her recordings for Prestige, on which Jones was featured with high-profile arrangers such as Oliver Nelson and jazz stars such as Frank Wess, Roy Haynes, and Gene Ammons, she had a musical partnership of more than 30 years with tenor saxophonist Houston Person, who received equal billing with her. He also produced her albums and served as her manager after the pair met in one of Johnny "Hammond" Smith's bands.

Although Etta Jones is likely to be remembered above all for her recordings on Prestige, her close professional relationship with Person (frequently, but mistakenly, identified as Jones' husband) helped ensure that the last two decades of her life would be marked by uncommon productivity, evidenced by a string of albums for Muse Records. In 1996, she recorded The Melody Lingers On, the first of five sessions for the HighNote label.

Her last recording, a tribute to Billie Holiday, was released on the day of Jones' death. Only one of her recordings—her debut album for Prestige Records (Don't Go to Strangers, 1960)—enjoyed commercial success with sales of over 1 million copies. Her remaining seven albums for Prestige, and beginning in 1976, her 12 recordings for Muse Records, and seven recordings for HighNote Records secured her a devoted following.

She died in Mount Vernon, New York at the age of 72 from cancer. She was survived by her husband, John Medlock, and a granddaughter.

Discography
 The Jones Girl...Etta...Sings, Sings, Sings (King, 1958)
 Don't Go to Strangers (Prestige, 1960)
 Something Nice (Prestige, 1961)
 So Warm: Etta Jones and Strings (Prestige, 1961)
 From the Heart (Prestige, 1962)
 Lonely and Blue (Prestige, 1962)
 Love Shout (Prestige, 1963)
 Hollar! (Prestige, 1963)
 Soul Summit Vol. 2 (Prestige, 1963)
 Jonah Jones Swings, Etta Jones Sings (Crown, 1964)
 Etta Jones Sings (Roulette, 1965)
 Etta Jones '75 (20th Century/Westbound 1975)
 Ms. Jones to You (Muse, 1976)
 My Mother's Eyes (Muse, 1978)
 If You Could See Me Now (Muse, 1979)
 Save Your Love for Me (Muse, 1981)
 Love Me with All Your Heart (Muse, 1984)
 Fine and Mellow (Muse, 1987)
 I'll Be Seeing You (Muse, 1988)
 Sugar (Muse, 1990)
 Christmas with Etta Jones (Muse, 1990)
 Reverse the Charges (Muse, 1992)
 At Last (Muse, 1995)
 My Gentleman Friend (Muse, 1996)
 The Melody Lingers On (HighNote, 1996)
 My Buddy: Etta Jones Sings the Songs of Buddy Johnson (HighNote, 1997)
 Some of My Best Friends Are...Singers with Ray Brown (Telarc, 1998)
 All the Way (HighNote, 1999)
 Together at Christmas (HighNote, 2000)
 Easy Living (HighNote, 2000)
 Etta Jones Sings Lady Day (HighNote, 2001)
 Don't Misunderstand: Live in New York  with Houston Person (HighNote, 2007)
 The Way We Were: Live in Concert  with Houston Person (HighNote, 2011)

Guest appearances
With Houston Person
 The Real Thing (Eastbound, 1973)
 The Lion and His Pride (Muse, 1994)
 Christmas with Houston Person and Friends (Muse, 1994)

References

External links 
 
 Etta Jones Discography

1928 births
2001 deaths
American jazz singers
20th-century African-American women singers
African-American jazz musicians
American women jazz singers
Jubilee Records artists
Muse Records artists
Prestige Records artists
People from Harlem
People from Aiken, South Carolina
Deaths from cancer in New York (state)
20th-century American singers
20th-century American women singers
Jazz musicians from New York (state)
HighNote Records artists